The International Bioacoustics Council  (IBAC) was founded in 1969 to encourage international  participation throughout the field of bioacoustics. Given its multidisciplinary nature, IBAC aims to bring together biologists from different specialisms. as well as engineers, sound archivists, computer scientists and other interested parties to foster discussion, share knowledge and exchange ideas surrounding the subject of vocal communication in animals.

History
IBAC emerged from earlier initiatives such as the International Committee for Bioacoustics (ICBA) which was formed in the USA in 1956. This short-lived organisation was replaced by the Enregistrements et Etudes des Chants et Cris d'Oiseaux (Institute ECHO) which was founded in France by Jean-Claude and Helen Roché in 1967. The primary aims of Institute ECHO were to make and publish wildlife sound recordings, organise research meetings and conferences, promote the scientific and musicological study of wildlife sounds and mount scientific expeditions. In 1969, Institute ECHO abandoned its scientific activities in order to concentrate on its publishing programme. In response to this change in focus, members interested in the scientific study of wildlife sounds decided to form IBAC

IBAC aims
The rules of IBAC state the following core purposes:

 To further the science of bioacoustics by the holding of congresses and by setting up task forces to examine specialist areas.
 To encourage and effect liaison between amateurs and professionals working in bioacoustics.
 To encourage students to take part in IBAC's activities.

IBAC activities
IBAC supports the sharing of recent research outputs and technological advancements through its biennial conferences, a list serve, a Facebook group and a website.

From 1971 to 1983 IBAC published Biophon, an informal journal which featured scientific articles, equipment reviews and information on forthcoming bioacoustics events. Two special issues were published in 1996 and 1997. A complete set of the journal is available for consultation at the British Library.

Conferences
Since its formation in 1969, IBAC has held 25 conferences in 12 different countries. The first conference was held in Kinross, Scotland in 1971. The first IBAC conference to occur outside Europe was held at the Center for Bioacoustics at Texas A&M University in October 1997. Other venues have included Brazil (2003).  The next conference will be held in October 2017 in Haridwar, India.

References

External links
 
 Current IBAC conference

Organizations established in 1969
Animal communication
Zoological societies